Khally Nazarova was a Soviet-Turkmenistani politician.

She served as Deputy Minister of Public Service Turkmenian SSR in 1958–1959. She was a such the first woman cabinet minister in Turkmenistan.   She served as Minister of Social Affairs in 1959–1962. She served as Deputy Premier Minister of the Turkmenian SSR in 1963–1965.

References

20th-century Turkmenistan women politicians
20th-century Turkmenistan politicians
Communist Party of Turkmenistan politicians
Soviet women in politics